a.k.a. Bait (1966) is a Japanese pink film directed by Hiroshi Mukai, credited as "Kan Mukai" in the international English-dubbed version, and starring Senjo Ichiriki and Michiko Shiroyami.

Synopsis
A gigolo is paid by a rich older woman to seduce young girls while she and friends watch his love-making behind a two-way mirror. He tries to break free of the older woman's control, but when his sick mother needs an operation, he returns to the rich woman, making love to her for money. Humiliated by his dependency, he takes the woman's daughter to the love-show, where he rapes her in front of her mother.

Cast
 Michiko Shiroyami
 Senjo Ichiriki
 Machiko Matsumoto
 Keisuke Senda
 Natsue Hanaha

Availability
Olympic International Films released The Bite to the U.S. grindhouse circuit soon after its original release in Japan. The film was released in Britain in 1967 as Bait.

Since its first run, The Bite had been considered a lost film. Jasper Sharp notes that had it not been for the overseas release of films like The Bite, these films would likely not be available today, as many early pink films were not saved in Japan. The film was rediscovered and released in an English-dubbed version on region-0 DVD by Gregory Hatanaka's Cinema Epoch label on May 13, 2008. Preceding the DVD release, Portland, Oregon's Clinton Street Theater played The Bite on a double feature with Mamoru Watanabe's Slave Widow (1967) on May 9 and May 11, 2008.

References

Bibliography
 
 
 
 
 
 

1966 films
Films directed by Kan Mukai
Pink films
1960s pornographic films
1960s Japanese films